Air Warrior III, known as Air Warrior 3 in Europe, is a video game developed by Kesmai Studios and published by Interactive Magic and Midas Interactive Entertainment for Microsoft Windows in 1997. The game had been scheduled to be released in January 1998, before being pushed forward for December 15, 1997.

Gameplay

Air Warrior III had as one playing area a map of northern Europe, besides many small playing fields with some real-life features labeled. Berlin, the Kiel Canal, and Peenemünde were unmarked in the game. There was also a playing area map that included a hodgepodge of Pacific islands and the coast of Australia. The player could design custom missions on any of these playing fields. Fans of the online competition developed a tool that enabled the players to paint their own aircraft. Screenshots could be taken in combat, and even videos, which could be distributed over the Internet. Douglas C-47s could be used to carry paratroops to take enemy air bases.

There were many ships and a few buildings to attack, including V-2s at Peenemünde, a bridge near Westminster's Parliament House, and the Brandenburg Gate of Berlin. However, targets that were destroyed soon re-appeared. Besides aircraft, the player could control a Jeep, a tank, a truck, or a Flakpanzer. The player could also drive through the fence surrounding after destroying it with a tank. The aircraft carriers and other ships were fixed at their places.

Reception

The game received favorable reviews according to the review aggregation website GameRankings. Next Generation said, "If there is one thing that Interactive Magic does well, it's flight simulations. The company has built a solid reputation on past hits, and Air Warrior III, despite a few minor hiccups, lives up to that reputation."

References

External links
 

1997 video games
Combat flight simulators
Video game sequels
Video games developed in the United States
Video games set in Korea
Windows games
Windows-only games
World War I video games
World War II video games